Lloyd Corrigan (October 16, 1900 – November 5, 1969) was an American film and television actor, producer, screenwriter, and director who began working in films in the 1920s. The son of actress Lillian Elliott, Corrigan directed films, usually mysteries such as Daughter of the Dragon starring Anna May Wong (one of a trilogy of Fu Manchu movies for which he has writing credits), before dedicating himself more to acting in 1938. His short La Cucaracha won an Academy Award in 1935.

Early life
Corrigan was born in San Francisco, California, to actress Lillian Hiby Corrigan (Lillian Elliott) (April 24, 1874 – January 15, 1959) and actor James Corrigan (October 17, 1867 – February 28, 1929).

Career
Corrigan studied drama at the University of California, Berkeley, from which he graduated in 1922.

Directing (1930–1937)
Follow Thru (1930) to Lady Behave! (1937).

Writing (1926–1939)
Hands Up! (1926) to Night Work (1939)

Acting (1925–1927, 1939–1966)
Corrigan's early roles: The Splendid Crime (1925), It (1927). Corrigan played both romantic leads and villains throughout his career. He also appeared in a number of Boston Blackie films as millionaire Arthur Manleder. He starred with Roy Acuff and William Frawley in the 1949 film, My Home in San Antone. In the 1950 film, Cyrano de Bergerac, he played Ragueneau, the lovable pastry cook, though in this version the role is partially combined with that of Ligniere, the drunken poet, who is omitted from the film.

Corrigan continued acting in films until the middle 1960s. He appeared on dozens of television programs, such as the uncle of Corky played by Darlene Gillespie in the Mickey Mouse Club serial, "Corky and White Shadow." He also appeared in two episodes of the NBC western, The Restless Gun with John Payne.

He was cast on ABC's religion anthology series, Crossroads. He appeared in the role of Wally Dippel in ABC's The Adventures of Ozzie and Harriet, in the syndicated crime drama, City Detective, with Rod Cameron, and on the television version of How to Marry a Millionaire, with Barbara Eden and Merry Anders. He appeared on NBC's Johnny Staccato with John Cassavetes, and the syndicated western, Man Without a Gun, starring Rex Reason and Mort Mills. Six times Corrigan portrayed the western author Ned Buntline in ABC's The Life and Legend of Wyatt Earp. He also guest starred on the CBS sitcom, Dennis the Menace, with Jay North in the series lead.

In 1959, Corrigan was cast as John Jenkins, with Anne Baxter as Ellie Jenkins, in the episode "A Race to Cincinnati" of the NBC western series, Riverboat, starring Darren McGavin and Burt Reynolds. In the story line, three ruthless men try to prevent a peach farmer from getting his crop to market so that he cannot make the last payment on his valuable land, which he will otherwise forfeit.

Corrigan appeared twice on the syndicated western anthology series, Death Valley Days. He was cast as the lucky hobo Carl Herman in the 1960 episode, "Money to Burn". Helen Kleeb played a recipient of Herman's largess. Paul Sorensen and William Boyett played the thieves whose $50,000 Herman found and gave away. In 1962, Corrigan played Dorsey Bilger, the bearer of tall tales in Totem, Idaho, in the 1962 episode, "A Sponge Full of Vinegar". In the story line, the townspeople have begun to tire of Bilger's stories. The episode also featured Chris Alcaide as Charlie Winslow and Paul Birch as Sheriff Lick.

From 1960 to 1961, Corrigan appeared as a series regular, Uncle Charlie, in the NBC sitcom Happy. He made guest appearances on CBS's Perry Mason in 1962 as Rudy in "The Case of the Dodging Domino," in 1963 as land financier and murderer Harvey Forrest in "The Case of the Decadent Dean," and in 1965 as Attorney Gerald Shore in "The Case of the Careless Kitten". In 1963, Corrigan portrayed Captain Rembrandt Van Creel in "The Day of the Flying Dutchman" on ABC's western series, The Travels of Jaimie McPheeters, starring child actor Kurt Russell. Dehl Berti portrayed the Indian, Little Buffalo. From 1965 to 1966, Corrigan appeared in the NBC TV sitcom Hank as Professor McKillup.

Complete filmography

As actor

The Splendid Crime (1925) as Kelly
It (1927) as Yacht Cabin Boy (uncredited)
The Great Commandment (1939) as Jemuel
High School (1940) as Dr. Henry Wallace
Young Tom Edison (1940) as Dr. Pender
Jack Pot (1940 short) as Mr. Higby (uncredited)
Two Girls on Broadway (1940) as Judge
Opened by Mistake (1940) as Anton Zarecki (uncredited)
The Ghost Breakers (1940) as Martin
Queen of the Mob (1940) as C. Jason - Photographer
Sporting Blood (1940) as Otis Winfield 
The Lady in Question (1940) as Prosecuting Attorney
The Return of Frank James (1940) as Randolph Stone
Captain Caution (1940) as Capt. Stannage
Public Deb No. 1 (1940) as Hugh Stackett
Dark Streets of Cairo (1940) as Baron Stephens
A Girl, a Guy and a Gob (1941) as Pigeon Duncan
Men of Boys Town (1941) as Roger Gorton
Whistling in the Dark (1941) as Harvey Upshaw
The Mexican Spitfire's Baby (1941) as Chumley
Confessions of Boston Blackie (1941) as Arthur Manleder
Kathleen (1941) as Dr. Montague Foster
Bombay Clipper (1942) as George Lewis
Treat 'Em Rough (1942) as Gray Kingsford
North to the Klondike (1942) as Doctor Curtis
The Great Man's Lady (1942) as Mr. Cadwallader
Alias Boston Blackie (1942) as Arthur Manleder
The Mystery of Marie Roget (1942) as Prefect Gobelin
The Wife Takes a Flyer (1942) as Thomas Woverman
The Great Man's Lady (1942) as Mr. Cadwallader
Maisie Gets Her Man (1942) as Mr. Marshall J. Denningham
Eyes of the Underworld (1942) as J.C. Thomas
Boston Blackie Goes Hollywood (1942) as Arthur Manleder
Lucky Jordan (1942) as Ernest Higgins
Secrets of the Underground (1942) as Maurice Vaughn
Tennessee Johnson (1942) as Mr. Secretary
Hitler's Children (1943) as Franz Erhart
London Blackout Murders (1943) as Inspector Harris
After Midnight with Boston Blackie (1943) as Arthur Manleder
King of the Cowboys (1943) as William Kraley - Governor's Secretary
The Mantrap (1943) as Anatol Duprez
Captive Wild Woman (1943) as John Whipple
Stage Door Canteen (1943) as Lloyd Corrigan
Nobody's Darling (1943) as Charles Grant Sr.
The Chance of a Lifetime (1943, a Boston Blackie film) as Arthur Manleder
Tarzan's Desert Mystery (1943) as Sheik Abdul El Khim
Passport to Destiny (1944) as Prof. Frederick Walthers
Rosie the Riveter (1944) as Clem Prouty
Gambler's Choice (1944) as Ulysses Sylvester Rogers
The Adventures of Mark Twain (1944) as Town Citizen (uncredited)
Goodnight, Sweetheart (1944) as Police Chief Davis
Since You Went Away (1944) as Mr. Mahoney - Grocer
Song of Nevada (1944) as Professor Hanley
Reckless Age (1944) as Mr. Connors
Lights of Old Santa Fe (1944) as Marty Maizely
The Thin Man Goes Home (1944) as Dr. Bruce Clayworth
Lake Placid Serenade (1944) as Jaroslaw 'Papa' Haschek
What a Blonde (1945) as Employment Agency Clerk (uncredited)
Bring on the Girls (1945) as Beaster
The Crime Doctor's Courage (1945) as John Massey
Boston Blackie Booked on Suspicion (1945) as Arthur Manleder
The Fighting Guardsman (1946) as King Louis XVI
The Bandit of Sherwood Forest (1945) as Sheriff of Nottingham
She-Wolf of London (1946) as Detective Latham
Two Smart People (1946) as Dwight Chadwick
Shadowed (1946) as Fred J. Johnson
Lady Luck (1946) as Little Joe
The Chase (1946) as Emmerrich Johnson
Alias Mr. Twilight (1946) as Geoffrey Holden
The Ghost Goes Wild (1947) as The Late Timothy Beecher
Stallion Road (1947) as Ben Otis
Blaze of Noon (1947) as Reverend Polly
Adventures of Casanova (1948) as D'Albernasi
The Bride Goes Wild (1948) as "Pops"
The Big Clock (1948) as McKinley
Mr. Reckless (1948) as Hugo Denton
A Date with Judy (1948) as "Pop" Sam Scully
The Return of October (1948) as Attorney Dutton
Strike It Rich (1948) as Matt Brady
Homicide for Three (1948) as Emmanuel Catt
Home in San Antone (1949) as Uncle Zeke Tinker
The Girl from Jones Beach (1949) as Mr. Evergood
Blondie Hits the Jackpot (1949) as J.B. Hutchins
Dancing in the Dark (1949) as John Barker
And Baby Makes Three (1949) as Dr. William M. "Uncle Bill" Parnell
When Willie Comes Marching Home (1950) as Maj. Adams
Father Is a Bachelor (1950) as Judge Millett
My Friend Irma Goes West (1950) as Sharpie Corrigan
Cyrano de Bergerac (1950) as Ragueneau
Sierra Passage (1950) as Thaddeus 'Thad' Kring
The Last Outpost (1951) as Mr. Delacourt
Ghost Chasers (1951) as Edgar Alden Franklin Smith
Her First Romance (1951) as Mr. Gauss, School Principal
New Mexico (1951) as Judge Wilcox
Son of Paleface (1952) as Doc Lovejoy
Rainbow 'Round My Shoulder (1952) as Tobias, aka Toby
The Stars Are Singing (1953) as Miller
Marry Me Again (1953) as Mr. Taylor
Born in Freedom: The Story of Colonel Drake (1954 short) as Doctor Brewer
The Bowery Boys Meet the Monsters (1954) as Anton Gravesend
Return from the Sea (1954) as Pinky
Paris Follies of 1956 (1955) as Alfred Gaylord
Hidden Guns (1956) as Judge Wallis
The Restless Gun (1959) in Episode "The Lady and the Gun"
Joyful Hour (1960, TV Movie) as Innkeeper
The Manchurian Candidate (1962) as Holborn Gaines
Swingin' Together (1963, TV Movie) as Mr. Craig (uncredited)
It's a Mad, Mad, Mad, Mad World (1963) as the mayor of Santa Rosita
Lassie: A Christmas Tail (1963) as Mr. Nicholson

As director

Follow Thru (1930) (co-director, also uncredited screenwriter)
Along Came Youth (1930) (co-director)
Daughter of the Dragon (1931) (also screenwriter)
The Beloved Bachelor (1931)
No One Man (1932)
The Broken Wing (1932)
He Learned About Women (1932) (also screenwriter)
La Cucaracha (1934 short)
By Your Leave (1934)
Murder on a Honeymoon (1934)
Dancing Pirate (1936)
Night Key (1937)
Lady Behave! (1937 or 1938)

As writer

Hands Up! (1926)
Miss Brewster's Millions (1926)
Wet Paint (1926)
The Campus Flirt (1926)
Senorita (1927)
 Wedding Bills (1927)
Swim Girl, Swim (1927)
She's a Sheik (1927)
Red Hair (1928)
The Fifty-Fifty Girl (1928)
Hot News (1928)
What a Night! (1928) (story)
The Mysterious Dr. Fu Manchu (1928)
The Saturday Night Kid (1929)
Sweetie (1929)
The Return of Dr. Fu Manchu (1930)
Anybody's War (1930)
Follow Thru (1930) (uncredited) (also co-director)
Dude Ranch (1931)
The Lawyer's Secret (1931)
Daughter of the Dragon (1931) (also director)
He Learned About Women (1933) (story) (also director)
La Cucaracha (1934 short) (story) (also director)
That Navy Spirit (1937)
Campus Confessions (1938) (also story)
Touchdown, Army (1938)
Night Work (1939)

For TV
Willy (1954–1955), regular cast member as Papa Dodger
Corky and White Shadow A Mickey Mouse Club serial - 17 episodes, (January–February, 1956) as Uncle Dan
The Real McCoys (1958) as Hank Johnson, a new neighbor who defies Amos's class prejudices, and (1962) as Herbert Bentley, a businessman who rents the McCoys' roadside stand.
Happy (1960–1961), regular cast member as Uncle Charlie Dooley
Father Knows Best as Myron, one of Jim's insured who has a car accident with Cornell Wilde who was the guest star.
My Three Sons (1961) as Smitty, one of Bub's card playing mates.
Perry Mason Episode: "The Case of the Dodging Domino" (1962) as Rudy Mahlsted
Perry Mason Episode: "The Case of the Decadent Dean" (1963) as Harvey Forrest
Gunsmoke "The Magician" (1963) as Jeremiah
Bonanza (1964-1965) as Jesse Simmons / Doctor, 2 episodes
Hank (NBC 1965–66) as Professor McKillup

References

External links
 
  
 
 
 
 
 
 Lloyd Corrigan signatures

1900 births
1969 deaths
UC Berkeley College of Letters and Science alumni
American male film actors
American male screenwriters
American male television actors
Male actors from Los Angeles
Male actors from San Francisco
Writers from Los Angeles
20th-century American male actors
Film directors from Los Angeles
Screenwriters from California
20th-century American male writers
20th-century American screenwriters